The Sony α NEX-F3 is an entry level rangefinder-styled digital mirrorless interchangeable-lens camera announced by Sony on 17 May 2012.

References
http://www.dpreview.com/products/sony/slrs/sony_nexf3/specifications

NEX-F3
NEX-F3
Live-preview digital cameras
Cameras introduced in 2012